Chloropaschia fiachnalis is a species of snout moth in the genus Chloropaschia. It is found in South America.

References

Moths described in 1925
Epipaschiinae